is a former Japanese football player.

Playing career
Sasaki was born on May 19, 1966. He played as defender for Urawa Reds. He debuted in professional league against Yokohama Marinos in 1992 J.League Cup on September 27. However he could not play many matches and retired end of 1992 season.

Club statistics

References

External links

reds.uijin.com

1966 births
Living people
Japanese footballers
Japan Soccer League players
J1 League players
Urawa Red Diamonds players
Association football defenders